Bourbonitis Blues is an album by the musician Alejandro Escovedo, released in 1999 on Bloodshot Records.

Production
The tracks were recorded in Austin and in North Carolina, with a few live recordings from a Chicago show.

Critical reception
No Depression deemed the album "a modest effort: a mix of covers and fresh originals, studio tracks and live cuts, bound together with no apparent logic other than it’s all good, warm, current work."

Track listing
All tracks composed by Alejandro Escovedo; except where indicated
"I Was Drunk" (Live) – 4:53
"Irene Wilde" (Ian Hunter) – 2:52
"California Blues" (Live) (Jimmie Rodgers) – 3:21
"Guilty" – 4:54
"Amsterdam" (John Cale) – 3:43
"Everybody Loves Me" – 3:26
"Pale Blue Eyes" (Live) (Lou Reed) – 6:15
"Sacramento & Polk" (Live) – 4:44
"Sex Beat" (Jeffrey Lee Pierce) – 4:09

Personnel
Alejandro Escovedo - acoustic and electric guitar, vocals
Bill McCullough - pedal steel
Glenn Fukunaga - bass
Mycle Konopka - mixing
Hector Muñoz - drums
David Perales - violin, backing vocals
Maya Escovedo - photography
Joe Eddy Hines - acoustic and electric guitar
Todd V. Wolfson - photography
Chris Phillips - drums, percussion
Dana Lee Smith - artwork
Melissa Swingle - harmonica, backing vocals
Timothy Powell - engineer
Brian Standefer - cello
Tom V. Ray - bass
Chris Stamey - bass, guitar, harmonium, producer, engineer
Tim Harper - engineer
Kelly Hogan - vocals
Jon Langford - acoustic guitar, vocals

References 

Alejandro Escovedo albums
1999 albums
Bloodshot Records albums
Albums produced by Chris Stamey